Kauko 'Kake' Tapio Nieminen (born 29 August 1979, in Seinäjoki) is a Finnish former speedway rider who raced for several teams in the UK, Sweden, and Poland, and as part of the Finland national speedway team.

Career summary
Nieminen started his UK career with the Workington Comets in 2002 and was with them every season until 2008 except for 2006, when he rode for the Glasgow Tigers. Also in 2006, he represented Finland in the 2006 Speedway World Cup.

Nieminen was known by both Workington and Glasgow fans as 'The Flyin Finn' because of his racing style, which produces some high speed passing. In 2007 season, Nieminen returned to the Workington Comets, this time as captain, and also rode for Solkatterna in Sweden and TŻ Lublin in Poland. At the end of the season it was announced he would return the Comets in 2008.

His good form in 2008 was noticed by the Elite League team Lakeside Hammers, and he was signed to the squad to cover for injuries. Nieminen was signed as a full team member at Lakeside for the 2009 season. He joined Leicester Lions in July 2011, becoming the team captain and finishing third in the 2011 Premier League Riders' Championship. 

He became national champion of Finland for the third consecutive year in September 2011, after winning the Finnish Individual Speedway Championship. In November 2012 Lakeside Hammers announced that Kauko would be awarded a Testimonial meeting in 2013, with the venue to be decided. On 25 November 2012 Kauko was named to continue as captain of Leicester again for the 2013 Premier League season, in what would be his third season with that team. He also rode for Belle Vue during the season.

His final appearance in the UK was for Glasgow Tigers in 2015.

References 

1979 births
Living people
Finnish speedway riders
People from Seinäjoki
Belle Vue Aces riders
Glasgow Tigers riders
Lakeside Hammers riders
Leicester Lions riders
Workington Comets riders
Sportspeople from South Ostrobothnia